The Dangerously in Love Tour was the debut concert tour by American recording artist Beyoncé. Although the tour was intended to showcase songs from her debut solo album, Dangerously in Love, (2003) the set list also contained a special segment dedicated to Beyoncé's girl group Destiny's Child and featured songs from her 2003 film The Fighting Temptations. The stage was simple and featured a large LED screen in the back that displayed video images of Beyoncé and her dancers, as well as some images from her music videos and some prerecorded images. The tour was reviewed negatively by Dave Simpson of The Guardian who graded it with two stars out of five. The Dangerously in Love Tour only reached Europe and Beyoncé's performance, at the Wembley Arena in London, was filmed and later released on the CD/DVD Live at Wembley (2004).

Background and development
The Dangerously In Love Tour was the debut solo concert tour by American recording artist Beyoncé. The tour was intended to showcase songs from Beyoncé's debut solo album, Dangerously in Love released in 2003. However, the set list also contained a special segment of her show dedicated to her girl group Destiny's Child and songs from Beyoncé's 2003 film The Fighting Temptations ("Fever" and "Summertime"). The stage was simple and featured a large LED screen in the back that moved up and down throughout the entire show and displayed video images of Beyoncé and her dancers, as well as some images from her music videos and some prerecorded images with special effects. The show also featured a small staircase and platforms on both side of the stairs for her band. Beyoncé later toured alongside Missy Elliott and Alicia Keys as ensemble for the Verizon Ladies First Tour (2004) in North America.

Synopsis and reception
Dave Simpson of The Guardian described the opening of the show during his review: "Some while after Beyoncé is due on stage, a voice announces that the support act won't be appearing and that Beyoncé will be with us 'in a moment'. Like everything else – hits, boots, hair and sponsorship deals – moments are very big in Beyoncé world. An age later, cheers erupt for the raising of a curtain which revealed, er, a roadie fiddling with a drum kit. An hour later, the piped music is getting gradually louder to drown boos and the cries of small children whose parents are moaning it's getting past their bedtime." The show opens with "Baby Boy" which Beyoncé sang while being lowered onto the stage upside down. A highlight for many fans was her performance of "Dangerously in Love 2". During the tour, a special 8-minutes rendition of the song was performed.

Simpson of The Guardian reviewed the opening show of the tour negatively, grading it with two out of five stars. He was negative about Beyoncé's clothing during the show, saying: "The delays may well be down to Beyoncé's wardrobe, which could trouble Imelda Marcos. There are skimpy skirts, tails (for a note perfect if pointless version of Peggy Lee's 'Fever') and a general theme of low material, high glitz. But often, the main sparkle is on Beyoncé's outfit." He also added that "The dancers' 'naked suits' make the former church girl a raunchy rival to Kylie [Minogue]. But there's an interminable section where they pretend to be homies, and when Beyoncé disappears for long periods it feels like an expensive night with Legs and Co." He concluded his review by saying, 
"Clearly, the armies of industry professionals that put Beyoncé together aren't sure of her core audience. A vague Saturday night TV, family entertainment feel gradually gives way to a more intriguing cross between Liza Minnelli showbiz and thumping R&B. However, a ticker tape festooned 'Crazy in Love' and a belting 'Work It Out' suggest Beyoncé is best sticking to her roots. Bizarrely, if implausibly, she puts the carnage down to her tour manager falling off stage, but at least she's grasped one showbiz adage: the show must go on."

Broadcasts and recordings

On November 10, 2003, Beyoncé performed at the Wembley Arena in London; this was later put on a DVD, titled Live at Wembley, which was released in April 2004. It was accompanied by a CD comprising three previously-unreleased studio recorded songs and one remix each of "Crazy in Love", "Baby Boy" and "Naughty Girl". Behind-the-scenes footage can be also seen on the DVD. The album debuted at number seventeen on the Billboard 200, selling 45,000 copies in its first week. The DVD has been certified double platinum by the Recording Industry Association of America for shipping 200,000 copies. According to Nielsen SoundScan, it had sold 264,000 copies in the US by October 2007, while as at October 6, 2010, it had sold 197,000 digital downloads. In an interview with The New York Times in 2007, American singer Miranda Lambert revealed that Live at Wembley inspired her to "take little bits from that [Beyoncé performance]" for her live shows.

Setlist
"Baby Boy"
"Naughty Girl"
"Fever"
"Hip Hop Star"
"Yes"
"Work It Out"
"Gift from Virgo"
"Be with You"
"Speechless"
"Bug a Boo" / "No, No, No Part 2" / "Bootylicious" / "Jumpin', Jumpin'" / "Say My Name" / "Independent Women Part I" / "'03 Bonnie & Clyde" / "Survivor"
"Me, Myself and I"
"Summertime"
"Dangerously in Love 2"
Encore
 "Crazy in Love"

Tour dates

References

External links
Beyoncé's official website

Beyoncé concert tours
2003 concert tours